Pierre-Thomas Levassor, simply called Levassor, (25 January 1808, in Fontainebleau –  1 January 1870) was a French stage actor

Career 
 1842 : La Nuit aux soufflets, two-act comédie en vaudevilles by Dumanoir and Adolphe d'Ennery, Théâtre des Variétés : Duke Hercule III 
 1843 : Brelan de troupiers, one-act comédie en vaudevilles by Dumanoir an Étienne Arago, Théâtre du Palais-Royal : Father Gargousse, Valentin Gargousse and Éléonore Gargousse 
 1845 : Les Pommes de terre malades, by Clairville and Dumanoir, Théâtre du Palais-Royal : Titi
 1853 : Les Folies dramatiques, by Clairville and Dumanoir, Théâtre des Variétés : Griolet
 1854 : , two-act comedy mingled with singing by Eugène Labiche and Marc-Michel, Théâtre du Palais-Royal : Gusman de Follebraise

External links 
 Pierre Levassor on Les archives du spectacle
 Portrait-charge de Pierre Levassor (1808-1870) on Paris Musées
 Levassor in Galerie de la presse, de la littérature et des beaux-arts, Partie 1

French male stage actors
19th-century French male actors
1808 births
People from Fontainebleau
1870 deaths